Beaumont Asquith (16 September 1910 – 12 April 1977) was an English professional footballer who played as an inside forward.

Career
Born in Painthorpe, Wakefield, Asquith played for Painthorpe Amateurs, Barnsley, Manchester United, Bradford City and Scarborough.

References

1910 births
1977 deaths
English footballers
Barnsley F.C. players
Manchester United F.C. players
Bradford City A.F.C. players
Scarborough F.C. players
English Football League players
Association football inside forwards